The Team relay competition at the 2017 World Championships was held on 29 January 2017.

Results
The race was started at 15:03.

References

Team relay